Note: the Wigner distribution function is abbreviated here as WD rather than WDF as used at Wigner distribution function
A Modified Wigner distribution function is a variation of the Wigner distribution function (WD) with reduced or removed cross-terms.

The Wigner distribution (WD) was first proposed for corrections to classical statistical mechanics in 1932 by Eugene Wigner. The Wigner distribution function, or Wigner–Ville distribution (WVD) for analytic signals, also has applications in time frequency analysis. The Wigner distribution gives better auto term localisation compared to the smeared out spectrogram (SP). However, when applied to a signal with multi frequency components, cross terms appear due to its quadratic nature. Several methods have been proposed to reduce the cross terms. For example, in 1994 L. Stankovic proposed a novel technique, now mostly referred to as S-method, resulting in the reduction or removal of cross terms. The concept of the S-method is a combination between the spectrogram and the Pseudo Wigner Distribution (PWD), the windowed version of the WD.

The original WD, the spectrogram, and the modified WDs all belong to the Cohen's class of bilinear time-frequency representations :

where  is Cohen's  kernel function, which is often a low-pass function, and normally serves to mask out the interference in the original Wigner representation.

Mathematical definition 

Wigner distribution

Cohen's kernel function : 

Spectrogram

Cohen's kernel function :  which is the WD of the window function itself. This can be verified by applying the convolution property of the Wigner distribution function.

The spectrogram cannot produce interference since it is a positive-valued quadratic distribution.

 Modified form I

Can't solve the cross term problem, however it can solve the problem of 2 components time difference larger than window size B.

 Modified form II

 Modified form III (Pseudo L-Wigner Distribution)

Where L is any integer greater than 0

Increase L can reduce the influence of cross term (however it can't eliminate completely )

For example, for L=2, the dominant third term is divided by 4 ( which is equivalent to 12dB ).

This gives a significant improvement over the Wigner Distribution.

Properties of L-Wigner Distribution:

 The L-Wigner Distribution is always real.
 If the signal is time shifted , then its LWD is time shifted as well, 
 The LWD of a modulated signal is shifted in frequency 
 Is the signal is time limited, i.e.,  then the L-Wigner distribution is time limited,  
 Integral of L-Wigner distribution over frequency is equal to the generalized signal power: 
 Integral of over time and frequency is equal to the power of the norm of signal : 

 The integral over time is:

  

 Modified form IV (Polynomial Wigner Distribution Function)

It can avoid the cross term when the order of phase of the exponential function is no larger than 

However the cross term between two components cannot be removed.

should be chosen properly such that

If 

when  ,   

Pseudo Wigner distribution

Cohen's kernel function :  which is concentred on the frequency axis.

Note that the pseudo Wigner can also be written as the Fourier transform of the “spectral-correlation” of the STFT

Smoothed pseudo Wigner distribution : 
In the pseudo Wigner the time windowing acts as a frequency direction smoothing. Therefore, it suppresses the Wigner distribution interference components that oscillate in the frequency direction. Time direction smoothing can be implemented by a time-convolution of the PWD with a lowpass function  :

Cohen's kernel function :  where  is the Fourier transform of the window .

Thus the kernel corresponding to the smoothed pseudo Wigner distribution has a separable form. Note that even if the SPWD and the S-Method both smoothes the WD in the time domain, they are not equivalent in general.

S-method 

Cohen's kernel function : 

The S-method limits the range of the integral of the PWD with a low-pass windowing function  of Fourier transform . This results in the cross-term removal, without blurring the auto-terms that are well-concentred along the frequency axis.
The S-method strikes a balance in smoothing between the pseudo-Wigner distribution  [] and the power spectrogram  [].

Note that in the original 1994 paper, Stankovic defines the S-methode with a modulated version of the short-time Fourier transform : 

where

Even in this case we still have

See also 
 Time-frequency representation
 Wigner distribution function
 Bilinear time–frequency distribution
 Short-time Fourier transform
 Gabor transform

References
P. Gonçalves and R. Baraniuk, “Pseudo Affine Wigner Distributions : Definition and Kernel Formulation”, IEEE Transactions on Signal Processing, vol. 46, no. 6, Jun. 1998
L. Stankovic, “A Method for Time-Frequency Analysis”, IEEE Transactions on Signal Processing, vol. 42, no. 1, Jan. 1994
L. J. Stankovic, S. Stankovic, and E. Fakultet, “An analysis of instantaneous frequency representation using time frequency distributions-generalized Wigner distribution,” IEEE Trans. on Signal Processing, pp. 549-552, vol. 43, no. 2, Feb. 1995 

Signal processing
Transforms